The 1867 Keelung earthquake occurred off the northern coast of Taiwan on the morning of December 18 with a magnitude of 7.0. It produced strong shaking that seriously damaged the cities of Keelung and Taipei. A tsunami, thought to be the only confirmed destructive of its kind in Taiwan, drowned hundreds and had a run-up exceeding . The total death toll was estimated to be 580 while more than 100 were injured. It was followed by aftershocks that were felt on average ten times a day.

Tectonic setting
Taiwan is situated on a complex convergent boundary between the Eurasian Plate and the Philippine Sea Plate. Off the northeastern coast of the island, the Philippine Sea Plate subducts northwards beneath the Ryukyu Islands (on the overriding Eurasian Plate) along the Ryukyu Trench. To the south of the island, oceanic crust of the Eurasian Plate subducts beneath eastwards the Philippine Sea Plate along the Manila Trench. Taiwan lies at the junction of the two subduction zones, on the edge of the Asian continental margin (Eurasian Plate), where the northwest–southeast convergence rate is estimated to be 7 cm/year. Continental collision occurs due to convergence of the Asian continental crust with continental crust of the Philippine Sea Plate on the island. Continental crust of the Eurasian Plate is being subducted beneath the island, forming east-dipping thrust faults.

Geology
Multiple studies have been conducted to identify the source of the earthquake and subsequent tsunami. The moment and local magnitudes have been estimated to be 7.0 and 6.8, respectively. Due to the unusually large tsunami, several studies have suggested a submarine landslide or an eruption of the nearby Tatun Volcano Group was the source of the tsunami.

The lack of historical documentation of the tsunami effects made identifying the fault difficult. Academics have associated the earthquake with a rupture along the Shanchiao Fault, a northeast–southwest trending normal fault. The fault dips towards the southeast at varying angles of 80° onshore to 62° offshore. It was also associated with an earthquake and tsunami in 1694. The Jinshan area formed due to rifting during the Quaternary.

In a 2017 study by Sugawara and others, modelling of the earthquake suggest a 7.24  event with coseismic slip of 6 meters was required to reproduce the tsunami heights reported. The modelled earthquake involved a rupture on the onshore and offshore segments.

Earthquake
The earthquake occurred at 09:00 or 10:00 local time and produced shaking that lasted 15–30 seconds. In Taipei's Shilin District, many streets were damaged. Buildings collapsed in the city, killing hundreds. Major landslides occurred between Taipei and Keelung, demolishing villages. The landslide carved a gorge and hot sulfur-laced water flowed. Fissures formed and closed in the ground. More than half the number of homes in Jinshan collapsed. One person was killed and many were injured in Huangku when a hot spring erupted from a field. Water from the spring formed a large pond that still exists. Heavy damage was reported at Keelung where collapses buried several hundred residents. In Tamsui, homes collapsed, killing 30, and a British merchant warehouse was extensively damaged. At a nearby town, not far from Tamsui, 150 deaths occurred. An estimated 400 people were killed near the coast. The earthquake also killed more than 300 buffaloes and pigs due to collapses.

Tsunami

The tsunami struck at 11:00 local time, killed between 70 and 80 people in Jinshan. Tsunami victims were also reported at Yilan and Hualien. Many were killed after they went to the coast to collect fishes after the water receded. Over 100 were injured. Several Chinese junks were beached and pushed further inland while others sunk. The waves destroyed 200 homes. The high run-up at Jinbaoli Old Street was due to a river which allowed waves from the sea to flow upstream. Tsunami damage at Keelung was minimal and only affected the immediate coastal parts of the city. Waves were reported on Heping Island and Tongpan Island. An unusual tide was observed at Hangzhou while at the Yangtze River, the water level fell  before rising  in 48 hours. These observations are believed to be the effects of the tsunami.

Volcanic eruption
A report of a submarine eruption at the time of the earthquake and tsunami was vaguely described and published in 1917. It is thought to be the only instance of an earthquake, tsunami and eruption occurring at the same time in the region. The eruption occurred off the northeast coast of the island but nature of it is unknown.

See also
 List of historical earthquakes
 List of earthquakes in Taiwan

References 

1867 earthquakes
Earthquakes in Taiwan
1867 in Taiwan
1867 floods
Tsunamis in Taiwan
1867 disasters in Asia
Tsunamis in China
Landslides in Taiwan
Keelung
History of New Taipei
History of Taipei